The familiar name and large size of the Titans have made them dramatic figures suited to market-oriented popular culture.

General or collective references
 In the 2011 movie Immortals starring Henry Cavill and Mickey Rourke, the Titans are locked away in Mount Tartarus until they are released by King Hyperion using the Epirus Bow. The Titans look like Gods but have dark orange helmets and their skin is a rock color. There appear to be more Titans in the film than in actual mythology. 
 In the Disney 1997 animated film Hercules there are five Titans. Four of them embody the four classical elements: The Rock Titan, The Ice Titan, The Lava Titan, and the Tornado Titan. A fifth Titan, the one-eyed Cyclops, is not associated with any element. They terrorize the earth until Zeus imprisons them; however, Hades later releases them to aid in his attempt to usurp Zeus. These Titans bear little similarity to their mythological counterparts. Later, in the animated series, the Titan Kronos is mentioned. The Disney versions of the Titans also appear in various games in the Disney-Square Enix video game franchise Kingdom Hearts.
In the 1981 film Clash of the Titans, the Kraken, actually an entity from Norse mythology, is presented as "the last Titan". It also describes the usage of the head of Medusa, who is actually a Gorgon, to fight him, as "a titan against another titan". In the 2010 remake, the Titans are mentioned at the beginning, when it is claimed Hades created the Kraken to defeat them. Kronos appears in the sequel Wrath of the Titans, where Ares turned to darkness and planned to revive his grandfather with Zeus' life force.
 The Italian sword-and-sandal film Arrivano i titani shows the Titans first as prisoners in Tartarus, but they are later liberated by Zeus to take down the megalomanic King Cadmus.
 The video game series God of War, which is based on Greek mythology, features many of the Titans, mainly Gaia, Cronos and Atlas. They attempt to reignite their Great War with the Olympians with the help of a Spartan warrior named Kratos, who became the God of War after killing Ares.
 The Titans appeared in an episode of Charmed titled "Oh My Goddess" where Cronus, Demtrieus and Meta battled the Charmed Ones who became Goddesses. Eventually, the Titans were destroyed by Piper Halliwell.
 The Titans occasionally appear or are mentioned in Renaissance Pictures' Hercules/Xena franchise. In the Xena: Warrior Princess episode "The Titans," many Titans (far more than in the actual myths) were turned to stone by the Olympians, which Crius, Hyperion and Theia seek to undo. In the Hercules: The Legendary Journeys episode "Let There Be Light," it is said that the Titans successfully defeated Dahak, but the battle left them too weak to resist the Olympians. Also, in the Hercules series finale "Full Circle," Oceanus, Helios and Atlas appear, having made a deal with Ares to destroy the Olympians but spare him.
 Titan appears as a regular Earth-based summon in the video game series Final Fantasy.
The Titans are a race of Eternals (gods) in the Warcraft universe. They are depicted as tall figures with metallic-colored skin. They defeated the Old Gods, who originally ruled Azeroth long ago, before the invasion of the Burning Legion.
 In the tabletop game Warhammer 40,000, Titans are phenomenally large war machines, capable of laying waste to entire armies and cities with their colossal weapons. They are often referred to as "god-Machines" by Imperial forces, for they are virtually unstoppable (generally the only threat to a Titan on the battlefield is a Chaos Titan, or similar constructs created by other races).
 The largest class of combat vessels in the MMORPG Eve Online are classified as 'titans', and several of the Gallente faction vessels are named after Greek deities.
 In the series Percy Jackson and the Olympians, the Titans are the main villains, attempting to take over Olympus and rule civilization once more, after most of them were imprisoned in the Underworld.
In DC Comics the Titans were exiled to another world after their defeat, which they called New Cronos. Kronos, however, was imprisoned in a tree. The Titans raised Troia and gave her her powers.
 Titans are depicted in Dante Alighieri's Inferno.
 The tabletop roleplaying game Exalted features a number of titan-like Primordials who were usurped by the gods prior to the First Age.
 The NVIDIA GeForce Titan was released 2013 and was at the time the most powerful GPU sold.
 In 2004, the Japanese automaker Nissan began production of a full-sized pickup truck for the North American market called the Titan.
 In Resident Evil Outbreak File #2, the giant zombie elephant rampaging throughout one scenario is called Titan.
 In the [[Dune (franchise)|Dune series]] created by Frank Herbert and continued by his son, Brian Herbert, a group of rebels conquest the Old Empire. They call themselves Titans and their reign the Time of Titans.
 The popular Age of Empires Spin-off, Age of Mythology at first only contains three civilizations and mythologies: The Norse, the Greeks, and the Egyptians. Added in later in an equally-popular expansion, a fourth civilization was added, Atlantis, which worshipped the Titans. They are portrayed, as a whole, largely neutral with some Titans even switching sides at some points in the game for no reason. There are three Major Titans that can be worshipped: Chronos, Gaia, and Ouranos. Gaia is shown generally as good, Chronos as evil. Ouranos is mostly portrayed as a good force, but at one point in the game, his followers are on the evil side, however later still being the major god of the protagonists in one of the final battles.
 In the Brütal Legend video game, Titans are a race of benevolent creatures who invented music and left it for the modern world.
 In the Dennou Boukenki Webdiver, there is the final giant robot named Ditalion, which based on a Titan.
 The primary antagonists in the manga and anime series Attack on Titan are called "Titans" and are depicted as a race of mute giants that attack and eat humans on sight. In the series, the Titans had driven humanity to the brink of extinction, forcing the last humans to take refuge in a single medieval nation (Paradis) surrounded by three concentric walls.
 In the manga Saint Seiya Episode.G, the Titans are important villains, attempting to rule civilization once more, and Leo Aiolia and the Gold Saints are assigned to stop them.
 The videogame Titan Quest tells the story of how the Telkine manage to cut off the gods from the mortal realms and attempt to free Typhon (identified in the game as a Titan) to have him assault Mount Olympus, with the player being a Greek soldier rising to the challenge and defending the world from the onslaught of mythological beasts and monsters.
 The videogame franchise Borderlands features various references to the Titans throughout each installment in the series. In the story, four characters called Vault Hunters end up on a planet called Pandora to search for a mythical alien Vault. The Vault is said to contain a cache of rare and powerful weapons. The Vault Hunters aren’t the only ones after this legendary stash. Among the others are the Atlas and Hyperion Corporations. The Hyperion Corporation builds a massive, H-shaped space station in Pandora’s orbit called Helios on which a fair portion of gameplay takes place in the third game of the franchise, Borderlands The Pre-Sequel. One of the playable characters for this game is a “gladiator” known as Athena, who is an ex-employee of the now non-existent Atlas Corporation.
 The videogame Catacomb Abyss (1992) features a level called The Battleground of the Titans, with the two titan races being trolls and demons.
 In the MonsterVerse, Godzilla, King Kong and other kaiju are referred to as Titans. They originate from inside the Earth's core called the Hollow Earth which they head to the planet's surface to reclaim the world they once ruled.
 In The Owl House, Titans are shown to be canine in form and an extinct race with King who is one of the main characters, being the last of his kind is a juvenile.

Sports teams

 California State University, Fullerton Titans, a California State University.
 Gold Coast Titans, Australian rugby league team
 Newport Titans, a rugby league side who play out of Newport, South Wales. 
 Titans cricket team, the Nashua Titans, a South African cricket team based in Centurion and Benoni
 Tennessee Titans, American football team in the National Football League
 New York Titans, former name of the New York Jets, an American football team
 New York Titans (lacrosse), a team in the National Lacrosse League
 Victoria Titans, former professional basketball team from Melbourne in the NBL
 Titan Robotics Club, International School, Bellevue, WA - FIRST Robotics Competition team #492

Individual

Atlas
 In the God of War video game series, Atlas is encountered twice by protagonist Kratos. In the 2008 game Chains of Olympus, Atlas (voiced by Fred Tatasciore) is freed from his prison in Tartarus by Persephone in order to use Helios' power to destroy the Pillar of the World; Kratos destroys her and chains Atlas to the world, cursing him to hold it on his shoulders forever. In the 2007 game God of War II, while seeking The Sisters of Fate, Kratos is caught by Atlas (voiced by Michael Clarke Duncan) after falling down the Great Chasm battling Icarus. After breaking his chains, he attempts to kill Kratos, but is convinced to help him and helps him across the Great Chasm, wishing him luck and granting him the last of his magic, Atlas Quake.
 In Rick Riordan's The Titan's Curse (of the Percy Jackson & the Olympians series), Atlas is freed from the burden of the sky by various ways of tricking people to carry it, but near the end Percy and Artemis force him back under the Sky, though he kills his daughter the nymph Zoe in battle. He was the main antagonist of the book. He appears in The Last Olympian and tells the other Titans one of them should take his burden so he can fight, but is told that due to his failure Kronos is keeping him there.
 One of the models of Ford, Ford Atlas was named after the Titan.
 The wizard SHAZAM gains Stamina from Atlas, and grants it to Captain Marvel (DC Comics)
 Name of weapons manufacturer in the video game Borderlands (2009) and sequel Borderlands 3 (2019)
 Is featured in Smite (video game) as a playable guardian.

Coeus
 Coeus (as Koios) makes a brief appearance in The House of Hades, the penultimate book of The Heroes of Olympus. He speaks with his brother Iapetus, who he does not realize has abandoned the Titans and is now aiding and abetting their enemies. Koios claims that eventually the Titans would rule the cosmos once more, despite the fact that he and his brethren were defeated by the Olympians twice. He seems to feel disdain for his siblings, the Gigantes.

Crius
 He appears in Hercules and Xena – The Animated Movie: The Battle for Mount Olympus where he is depicted as the Wind Titan.
 In episode 7 of Xena: Warrior Princess, The Titans, Crius is awoken by Gabrielle alongside Theia and Hyperion.
 Crius (as Krios) is the main hero in the 1962 sword-and-sandal film Arrivano I Titani.
 Crius (as Krios) very briefly appears in the last Percy Jackson and the Olympians book, The Last Olympian. When the other Titans march to invade Manhattan, Krios is left behind to guard Mount Tamalpais, the location of the Titans' base, Othrys (named after their original home, Mount Othrys). While The Last Olympian doesn't say what happens to him, The Lost Hero (the first book of The Heroes of Olympus, the sequel series to Percy Jackson and the Olympians) reveals Othrys was invaded by the Roman demigods of Camp Jupiter, and Krios was defeated by Jason Grace. Krios reappears in the fourth book, The House of Hades. In the book, he and Hyperion are guarding the Doors of Death. He expresses the desire to strike back at Jason. In the end, his brother Iapetus (as Bob) tricks him into expressing doubts about serving their mother Gaea. Krios and Hyperion are destroyed by Tartarus.

Cronus/Saturn
 In the Sailor Moon meta series, Sailor Saturn is one of the lead characters. Sailor Saturn's powers are mostly based on Roman mythology, in which Saturn is the god of the harvest. As such, her primary role is that of the destroyer, with her ultimate attack being the ability to destroy a planet in one move although it would take her life. 
 Appears in the God of War video game series (spelled Cronos in series). In the 2005 game God of War, he is featured roaming the Desert of Lost Souls with Pandora's Temple (which holds Pandora's Box) chained to his back as punishment for his role in the Great War. In the 2007 game God of War II, Cronos (voiced by Lloyd Sherr) is featured in flashbacks showing when he devoured his children and it is revealed he had offered The Sisters of Fate the Steeds of Time in an attempt to change his fate (he also stored magic, "Cronos's Rage", in the Steeds which is acquired). In the 2010 game God of War III, it is shown that Cronos (voiced by George Ball) was banished to Tartarus since protagonist Kratos was able to conquer the temple chained to his back. He is then confronted as a boss that Kratos kills.
 In John C. Wright's Chronicles of Chaos, the world the children are in is the world of Saturn; although they differ in what story they know about the origin of the world, all agree that Saturn created it.
 In Rick Riordan's Percy Jackson & the Olympians, Kronos is the main antagonist. In The Last Olympian he possesses Hermes's demigod son Luke Castellan as the leader of the Titan attack on Mount Olympus with an army of monsters. However, with Percy's help Luke is able to regain enough control to kill himself to stop Kronos destroying Olympus.
 In the kid's show Class of the Titans, Cronus is the main antagonist voiced by David Kaye. He escaped from a 4000 years imprisonment and want revenge. The main characters have to get him back to Tartarus.
 In an episode of Samurai Jack the story of Cronus and the Titans and their fall plays a central role. A Swamp Hermit (actually a disguised Aku) has Jack collect three gems that once belonged to Cronus, but were hidden by Zeus on Earth after he defeated and stripped his father of his powers. Jack collects the three gem believing they can return him to his proper time. As the hermit, Aku uses them to create a monster to destroy Jack, however Jack realizing Aku's deception removes the Eye Of Cronus from Cronus' helmet, destabilizing the monsters body causing it to fall apart. Back into a corner, Aku tries to use the remaining gems (contained in Cronus' gauntlets) to destroy Jack but he destroys them with his sword forcing Aku to flee. The episode ends, with Jack still holding the Eye of Cronus gem, stating Aku's defeat is only a matter of time..
 In Uchu Sentai Kyuranger, Don Armage is based on Cronus/Saturn.

Eos/Aurora
 In The Awakening of Flora, Aurora consoles Flora with the news that Apollo will soon herald the day.
 Eos appears in the 2008 game God of War: Chains of Olympus. She informs Kratos (main character) that he must seek out the Primordial Fires to awaken the Fire Steeds which will find her brother Helios in the Underworld. Kratos also acquires her magic the Light of Dawn. In the 2010 game God of War III, she is referenced with a level called the Path of Eos.
 In John Milton's L'Allegro, Aurora is described as a possible mother of Euphrosyne.

Epimetheus
 Appears in the 2010 video game God of War III as one of the Titans in the assault on Mount Olympus. He is killed when Poseidon dives off Mount Olympus and through his chest, sending him off the mountain.

Hecate
 Hecate appears in Haley Riordan's short story The Son of Magic. She helps her demigod son Alabaster C. Torrington and the mortal Howard Claymore against her daughter Lamia. She reappears in Rick Riordan's novel The House of Hades, the penultimate book of The Heroes of Olympus series. She helps Hazel Levesque, a demigod child of Pluto, defeat her Gigante foe Clytius.

Helios
 In John C. Wright's The Golden Age, Helion has controlled the sun to prevent sunspots and other disruptive solar activities.
 In John C. Wright's Chronicles of Chaos, Helios is the father of Amelia/Phaetheusa, the narrator.
 Helios appears in Gareth Hinds' 2010 version of The Odyssey.
 Helios appears in 2018's The Burning Maze in The Trials of Apollo Series by Rick Riordan.
 Helios appears three times in the God of War video game series as the Sun God. He appears at the end of the 2007 game God of War II with fellow gods Hades, Poseidon, and Hermes as they are being urged to unite by Zeus to destroy Kratos. In the 2008 game God of War: Chains of Olympus, Helios (voiced by Dwight Schultz) is kidnapped by Atlas on behalf of Persephone so that they can use his power to destroy the Pillar of the World. The plan is thwarted by Kratos who rescues Helios who returns to the sky. His shield is also acquired for use in this game. In the 2010 game God of War III, which continues where God of War II ended: with the Titans climbing Mt. Olympus; Helios (voiced by Crispin Freeman) is the first to jump to battle, calling his chariot and jumping into it. He is later encountered by Kratos battling Perses in Olympia, but is defeated when Kratos fires a ballista at the chariot, which crashes into Perses' hand and thrown across the city. After a brief banter, Kratos pulls with his bare hands the Head of Helios from the Titan's shoulders, using it to show hidden secrets during his quest. His death causes the sun to be blocked by dark rain clouds. Helios also appears in the tie-in comic series (2010–11) where he enters into a wager with five other Olympian gods. Each choose a champion to search for the Ambrosia of Asclepius, an elixir with magical healing properties.
 In the Wii game Metroid Prime 3: Corruption, the second Seed guardian is named after Helios.
 Helios appears on the cover of 2011's Floral Shoppe by Vektroid under the alias Macintosh Plus

Hyperion
 Appears in the 2008 game God of War: Chains of Olympus as a Titan chained in the pits of Tartarus. He is also referenced throughout the God of War series, such as the Hyperion Gate, the Stone of Hyperion, etc.
 Marvel Comics features four Hyperions, two villains and two heroes from alternate universes.
 In Rick Riordan's The Last Olympian, Percy Jackson uses his powers over the sea to fight Hyperion. The Titan is imprisoned in a tree by a combined group of satyrs and dryads. The House of Hades, the penultimate book of The Heroes of Olympus, reveals that Hyperion was sent back to Tartarus. He is seen guarding the Doors of Death with his brother Krios. He is clearly fearful of the primordial god Tartarus, warning his brothers not to upset him. In the end, he and Krios are destroyed by the personification of the abyss itself.
 In Tarsem Singh's film Immortals, Hyperion is a king who declares war on humanity and leads a bloodthirsty army on a murderous rampage across Greece in search of the Epirus Bow in order to free the Titans and annihilate the Gods and mankind. Hyperion is played by Mickey Rourke.
 In StarCraft II: Wings of Liberty, Hyperion is the name of the Battlecruiser that Jim Raynor's rebellious forces command in the game. Originally, Dominion's capital ship, Raynor and his group hijacked it. Dominion replaced it with a larger, stronger capital ship.
Name of a weapons manufacturer in the Borderlands  video game series.
 In episode 7 of Xena: Warrior Princess, The Titans, Hyperion is awoken by Gabrielle alongside Theia and Crius.

Iapetus
 In Rick Riordan's short story The Sword of Hades, Iapetus is the main antagonist. With the help of the goddess Nemesis's demigod son Ethan Nakamura, he steals his nephew Hades's sword, a creation of the goddess Persephone. Iapetus is stopped by the combined force of Thalia Grace, Percy Jackson, and Nico di Angelo - all children of the Big Three gods (Zeus, Poseidon, and Hades). In a struggle, Percy knocks Iapetus into the River Lethe, destroying his memory. After this, Iapetus becomes known as Bob, an ally of the Olympians. Bob returns in the penultimate book of The Heroes of Olympus, The House of Hades, as a major protagonist. He helps Percy and Annabeth Chase escape from the depths of Tartarus. In the end, he sacrifices himself to ensure an Olympian victory in the second Gigantomachy.

Mnemosyne
 In the science fiction novel "City at the End of Time" by Greg Bear, Memnosyne plays a major, if largely invisible role in the plot, having created the protagonists (Ginny, Jack and Daniel) in order to restore her to her full power and save the future of the multiverse. 
 In "Sailor Moon Sailor Stars," there is a Sailor Senshi named Sailor Mnemosyne who appears alongside her twin, Sailor Lethe. They are a part of Shadow Galactica. Like her mythological counterpart, she is associated with memory.
 In Hercules and Xena – The Animated Movie: The Battle for Mount Olympus, Mnemosyne is re-imagined as the vicious Titaness of Fire. She also seems to be romantically involved with the Wind Titan Crius. She is still associated with memory, however, as in the Xena: Warrior Princess episode "Forget Me Not" (Season 3, Episode 14), the character of Gabrielle goes to the temple of Mnemosyne to try to forget her painful memories. (Throughout the episode, the Titaness' name is mispronounced in a fashion that rhymes with limousine.) In Hercules: The Legendary Journeys, Episode 91 "Let there be Light", Hercules visits Mnemosyne in person. This depiction combines elements of the other two depictions in the metaseries. Here, Mnemosyne is depicted as the fiery daughter of Cronos and an enemy of Zeus. Though angry and hostile towards Zeus, and by extension Hercules, Hercules sought her out for her wisdom and counsel.
  In Xanadu, Mnemosyne is the (unnamed) mother of the Nine Muses, including Kira, the heroine.
 Mnemosyne is the name of a computer software project that helps people to memorize facts, such as school exams, as well as builds data on memory research.
 In the MMPORG Asheron's Call, green triangular devices called Mnemosynes are used to store large amounts of knowledge/history and are used to pass this information across generations.
 In the Oliver Stone, ABC Event Series Wild Palms made for TV miniseries about a Cyber Cult, "Mnemosyne" was a vision inducing blue fluid.
 In Mass Effect 2, a mission takes place aboard a derelict ship orbiting around a Brown Dwarf named Mnemosyne.
 In the anime Rin - Daughters of Mnemosyne, the Time Spores that make women immortal also absorb their memories and anyone else's they pass through before depositing it back into Yggdrasil, the Tree of all Life.
 In La-Mulana 2, a ghost that relates part of the history of the 2nd Children, who were giants, is identified as "Mnemosyne's Remains".
 Bob Dylan's Rough and Rowdy Ways includes the song "Mother of Muses."

Oceanus
 Oceanus appears in the 2010 video game God of War III as one of the Titans in the assault on Mt. Olympus, but is pulled off the mountain by Hades. He was originally to appear in the 2007 video game God of War II but was cut during development.
Oceanus appears in the book The Last Olympian and fights against Poseidon to prevent him helping the Gods against Typhon while the Titans attack Olympus. After the Titans are defeated he sinks into the ocean.

Perses
 Perses appears in the 2010 video game God of War III, depicted as a massive brute made of rock and molten lava. As Kratos is ascending the Chain of Balance, Perses attacks him (possibly avenging Gaia, who Kratos had cast off Olympus), but is stabbed in the eye with the Blade of Olympus, sending him falling off.
 Recently, in the manga Medaka Box, the heroine Medaka entered a berserk state nicknamed Perses Mode.

Prometheus

 Prometheus is a supervillain in the DC Universe, who is an enemy of the Justice League. He stated that he named himself Prometheus because he "wanted to take fire from the Gods themselves. Steal their knowledge and techniques and use them against them". The "Gods" being anyone who is just using stolen money to purchase advanced weaponry.
 In Rick Riordan's The Last Olympian, Prometheus has joined the Titans. He seems to serve as the Titans' ambassador. He gives Percy Jackson Pandora's pithos and tries to convince Percy to open the lid and surrender.
 In the 2007 video game God of War II, Prometheus (voiced by Alan Oppenheimer) is featured as a character. Portrayed as being no larger than a normal man. He is chained up and an eagle eats him alive, only for him to be brought back to life every morning. Kratos (the player character) frees Prometheus (by self-immolation in fire) and gains the ability "Rage of the Titans" from Prometheus's ashes.
 In the American TV series Supernatural, Prometheus has escaped from his prison and is found by Sam and Dean Winchester, the show's protagonists who help him attempt to break his curse of dying each day and coming back to life. He also has a son who has the same curse. In the end, Prometheus kills Zeus and breaks the curse on himself and his son, but dies in the process.

Rhea
 Appears in the 2007 game God of War II in a flashback. She is shown preventing her son Zeus from being devoured by her husband Cronos.
 Rhea is humorously mentioned in The Lightning Thief as the mother of Zeus and Poseidon and a subject of their frequent fights. She is later referenced in the short story The Diary of Luke Castellan. The characters Luke Castellan and Thalia Grace restate the myth of Rhea's preventing Zeus from being devoured by her husband Kronos.
 Rhea is the name of one of the major characters of Fire Emblem: Three Houses. The character is the current leader and archbishop of the Church of Seiros, the game's religious organization.

Selene
 "Selene" ranked as the 987th most popular female first name for babies born in 2006 in the United States.
 "Selene" is the name of the moon's colony city in Einhander.
 In a young adult series, Daughters of the Moon, the daughters worshipped Selene. Selene gave them their powers and their reason for fighting the Atrox.
 In the Disney Channel Original Movie, Zenon: Z3, Selene (or "Selena" as she is called in the film) assigns Zenon with the task of evacuating the moon and getting all of their stuff off of her.
 Selene is a Marvel comic book villainess most often an antagonist of the X-Men and the Hellfire Club.
 The Sonata Arctica song "My Selene" is based on the myth of Selene and Endymion.
 Two songs by progressive rock group Gong, on the albums Camembert Electrique and Angel's Egg respectively, are called "Selene".
 Selena was the leader of the Moon Fae in Anne Bishop's Tir Alainn series.  Her second form was a shadow hound.
 Selene was an evil sorceress in books 1-6 and 14 of the Wicca Series by Cate Tiernan.
 Selene is an alias for Lanfear in the popular fantasy series Wheel of Time, by Robert Jordan. Lanfear's sigil is a number of stars and a crescent moon, and she is pale of skin with black hair and always wears silver and white. She is one of the strongest of the thirteen Forsaken and is in love with the reincarnation of Lews Therin Telamon, who was her lover in the Age of Legends.
 Selene is the name of a planet in the PlayStation game Colony Wars. It is located in the Draco system, which also contains the star Helios. The planet is briefly referred to in the cutscene entitled "Time To Strike".
 Selene is the name of the fictional protagonist from Underworld and Underworld: Evolution action films.
 Selene is one of the alternate names for certain characters in the anime Sailor Moon, namely Queen Serenity and Princess Serenity/Tsukino Usagi. Both were based very loosely upon the Greek myth.
 In the book Blood and Chocolate, the loup-garou are said to be descended from people blessed by Selene with the power to shape shift.
 John Keats's Endymion recounts Endymion's quest for this goddess, although terming her "Cynthia" which is normally a title of Artemis.

Tethys
 Tethys is a character in Greenwitch, in Susan Cooper's Dark is Rising series.
 She appears also in the animated film Hercules and Xena – The Animated Movie: The Battle for Mount Olympus and is the most human looking of the Titans, appearing as a water elemental giantess with long hair. But this version of her is utterly ferocious and ruthless, at one point picking up Aphrodite and attempting to crush her.
 Caitlin R. Kiernan introduced a white dream raven named Tethys, in her story "The Two Trees" (The Dreaming #43).
The Yu-Gi-Oh! card named Tethys, Goddess of Light is named for her.
 Tethys is a character in Fire Emblem: The Sacred Stones, she is a beautiful, charming, and flirtatious dancer.

Theia
 Theia tried to take over the world in the pages of The New Teen Titans.  In volume 2, issue 9, she was destroyed by her husband Hyperion's self-immolation.
 In episode 7 of Xena: Warrior Princess, The Titans'', Theia is awoken by Gabrielle alongside Crius and Hyperion.

References

Classical mythology in popular culture
Greek and Roman deities in fiction
Mythology in popular culture
Titans (mythology)
Rhea (mythology)
Cronus
Leto
Helios
Selene
Eos
Prometheus
Hecate